My Days (1974) is an autobiography by R. K. Narayan. It tells the story of Narayan's upbringing.  My Days is an autobiography which starts with his childhood spent in his grandmother's home in Chennai.

Notes

1974 non-fiction books
Books by R. K. Narayan
Literary autobiographies
Chatto & Windus books
Indian autobiographies